Montrose is a hamlet (and census-designated place) within the town of Cortlandt, in the northwestern corner of Westchester County, New York, United States. It is located near Croton-on-Hudson and Buchanan. The rural character of the hamlet is defined by the Hudson River, numerous wooded hills and steep slopes, wetland areas and beautiful streams. As of the 2010 census, Montrose had a population of 2,731.

Demographics

Government
The government of Montrose is run by the Town of Cortlandt. The Town Supervisor is Linda D. Puglisi and on the Town Board are Francis X. Farrell, Ann Lindau, John E. Sloan and Richard Becker.

Montrose Improvement District
Montrose's water is provided by a local independent water company, the Montrose Improvement District, which purchases water from New York City's Catskill Aqueduct and sells it to Peekskill, Cortlandt and to Montrose residents.

Education
Montrose is in the Hendrick Hudson School District (HHUD). In Montrose there are two schools, Hendrick Hudson High School and Frank G. Lindsey Elementary School. Other schools in the HHUD (which are not in Montrose) are Blue Mountain Middle School, Buchanan-Verplanck Elementary School, and Furnace Woods Elementary School. The Hendrick Hudson Free Library is located at 185 Kings Ferry Road in Montrose and covers the communities of Buchanan, Verplanck, Crugers, Montrose, and parts of Cortlandt Manor, Croton-on-Hudson, and the city of Peekskill. It has six on-line computers with ready access to a variety of databases and the internet. The Community Room seats 100 people and serves as a gallery space for art exhibits.

Features
The town is home to the Franklin D. Roosevelt campus of the Hudson Valley Veterans Affairs healthcare system, whose sprawling campus contains 50 brick buildings. George's Island Park is a  waterfront park that offers nice scenery of the Hudson River. It contains tidal wetlands, a freshwater pond and wooded trails, and provides boat access to the Hudson River as well as areas for nature study and picnicking. Sunset Field and Seabolt Field/Playground are the main recreational parks for baseball and football.

Notable people
 Frederick W. Seward, Assistant U.S. Secretary of State during the Civil War
 Frederick Paul Keppel, President of the Carnegie Corporation of New York, 1922-1941

References

External links
 Westchester County

Hamlets in New York (state)
Census-designated places in New York (state)
Census-designated places in Westchester County, New York
Hamlets in Westchester County, New York
New York (state) populated places on the Hudson River